Vice-Admiral Herbert Arthur Buchanan-Wollaston, CMG (13 October 1878 – 24 March 1975) was a Royal Navy officer. As captain of HMS Calypso, he oversaw the rescue of the Greek royal family from Corfu in 1922.

References 

 http://dreadnoughtproject.org/tfs/index.php/Herbert_Arthur_Buchanan-Wollaston
 https://www.ukwhoswho.com/view/10.1093/ww/9780199540891.001.0001/ww-9780199540884-e-161146

1878 births
1975 deaths
Royal Navy vice admirals
Royal Navy admirals of World War I
Companions of the Order of St Michael and St George